Worgu Boms (born 31 March 1968) is a Nigerian lawyer and a former Rivers State Attorney-General and Commissioner of Justice.

https://ejesgist.com/things-you-should-know-about-the-new-apc-deputy-national-secretary-worgu-boms.html

Education
Boms went to State School Elekahia, Port Harcourt and Government Secondary School, Eneka. He had his tertiary education at the Rivers State University of Science and Technology and received his B.L. certificate from Nigerian Law School.

Career
In 1992, he gained entry into the Nigerian Bar and National Youth Service programme. Shortly after, he started practicing with the law firm of Serena David Dokubo & Co in Port Harcourt before founding Worgu Boms Chambers.

Boms is affiliated with the Nigerian Bar Association and the International Bar Association. He has taken part in Conferences and Workshops in Nigeria and overseas, including the Cambridge International Symposium on Economic Crimes. He has chaired the Port Harcourt branch of the Nigeria Bar Association. In 2011, he was appointed the Attorney-General and Commissioner of Justice in the cabinet of Governor Chibuike Amaechi.

References

External links
Boms profile from RSBoPP website

1968 births
Living people
Rivers State lawyers
Rivers State politicians
Rivers State University alumni
Nigerian Law School alumni
Ikwerre people
Attorneys General of Rivers State
Rivers State Commissioners of Justice